Miroslav (Friedrich) Navratil (19 July 1893 – 7 June 1947) was a Croatian soldier, pilot, and general who served in the armies of Austria-Hungary, the Kingdom of Yugoslavia, and the Independent State of Croatia.

Until the end of World War I

Navratil was born in Sarajevo in the Condominium of Bosnia and Herzegovina. He attended high school in Sarajevo, and finished cadet's school in Graz. In World War I he served in the Austro-Hungarian Armed Forces, as a fighter pilot in the Imperial and Royal Aviation Troops. While on the Eastern and Italian fronts, he scored a victory with Flik 41J on 14 April 1918, before assuming command of Flik 3J on 9 June 1918. Flying Albatros D.IIIs, he scored nine more victories. 

He attained the rank of Oberleutnant. His victory string ran until 31 August, when he downed a Bristol F.2 Fighter, but lost all four of his inexperienced wingmen in the process. Navratil blamed himself for their loss. He largely removed himself from combat operations. On 21 October, during a test flight of an Albatros D.III, his seat broke, and he was injured in the resultant crash landing. He did not recover before the Armistice.

Between the World Wars
In 1918, Austria-Hungary dissolved and Navratil moved to the newly formed Kingdom of Serbs, Croats and Slovenes, where he took on a position in the royal army. He rose to the rank of colonel, but was eventually retired from the army in 1940 because of conflict with Serb officers within its ranks.

World War II
With the establishment of the Independent State of Croatia on 10 April 1941 Navratil was brought back into active service. He was named as a military representative in Bucharest. He served as minister of the armed forces from 2 September 1943 to 29 January 1944. After he was relieved of his post, reportedly due to complaints about the brutality of the government, he traveled to Vienna, where his family was located and remained there until the end of World War II. In 1945 he moved to Zell am See, where he lived until he was located by American troops in 1946. He was extradited to communist Yugoslavia in December 1946. In Zagreb he was sentenced to death on charge of war crimes, and executed on 7 June 1947.

Awards
Order of the Crown of King Zvonimir with Swords - September 1943

Notes

References

Tko je tko u NDH, "Miroslav Navratil". Minerva. Zagreb, 1997.

1893 births
1947 deaths
Military personnel from Sarajevo
Austro-Hungarian World War I flying aces
Croatian people of World War I
Croatian soldiers
Croatian collaborators with Nazi Germany
Executed Yugoslav collaborators with Nazi Germany
Prisoners and detainees of the United States military
Croatian military personnel of World War II
Croatian Home Guard personnel
Government ministers of the Independent State of Croatia
Recipients of the Order of the Crown of King Zvonimir
Executed Croatian people
Executed Bosnia and Herzegovina people
Recipients of the Iron Cross (1914), 2nd class
Croats of Bosnia and Herzegovina